The Medical Affairs Bureau (MAB) is the affiliated authority of the Ministry of National Defense of the Republic of China aimed to establish a streamlined and high quality military medical corps that provides armed forces with medical services to fulfill military build-up and combat missions.

Organizational structures
 Department of Medical Management
 Department of Medical Planning
 Department of Medical Readiness and Healthcare
 Department of Pharmaceutical Management
 Comptroller Office

Transportation
The MAB headquarter office is accessible within walking distance west from Dazhi Station of Taipei Metro.

See also
 Ministry of National Defense (Republic of China)

References

1925 establishments in China
Executive Yuan
Government agencies established in 1925